Luciano Gabriel Pogonza (born 1999) is an Argentine professional footballer who plays as a midfielder for Ben Hur.

Career
Pogonza started out in the youth set-up of Sagrado Corazón in Rosario, prior to going to Atlético de Rafaela in 2009. The latter gave Pogonza his start in senior football. His bow in the professional game arrived in February 2019, with Juan Manuel Llop selecting him to start an eventual 0–1 loss in Primera B Nacional at the Estadio Nuevo Monumental versus Villa Dálmine. After twelve appearances in all competitions, Pogonza was loaned out to 9 de Julio. He returned to Rafaela after training had resumed following the COVID-19 pandemic, though picked up an injury soon after.

Career statistics
.

References

External links

1999 births
Living people
Sportspeople from Santiago del Estero Province
Argentine footballers
Association football midfielders
Primera Nacional players
Atlético de Rafaela footballers
9 de Julio de Rafaela players
Club Sportivo Ben Hur players